The natural environment, commonly referred to simply as the environment, includes all living and non-living things occurring naturally on Earth.

The natural environment includes complete ecological units that function as natural systems without massive human intervention, including all vegetation, animals, microorganisms, soil, rocks, atmosphere and natural phenomena that occur within their boundaries. Also part of the natural environment is universal natural resources and physical phenomena that lack clear-cut boundaries, such as air, water, and climate.

0–9

A

B

C

D

E

Ea – Ec

Ed – Eng

Env

Ep – Ez

F

G

H

I

J

K

L

M

N

O

P

Q–R

S

T

U

V

W

X–Z

See also

 Outline of environmentalism
 Environmentalism
 List of environmental issues
 Index of climate change articles
 Index of conservation articles
 List of environmental issues
 Outline of environmental studies
 Environmental studies
 Index of pesticide articles

 List of environmental topics